Bulia is a genus of moths in the family Erebidae.

Species
 Bulia brunnearis (Guenée, 1852)
 Bulia confirmans Walker, [1858]
 Bulia deducta Morrison, 1875
 Bulia mexicana Behr, 1870
 Bulia schausi Richards, 1936
 Bulia similaris Richards, 1936

Former species
 Bulia bolinalis (Walker, 1866)
 Bulia morelosa Richards, 1941

References

External links
 
 

 
Melipotini
Moth genera